Mississippi Highway 349 (MS 349) is a  north–south state highway in the North Central Hills region of North Mississippi. It connects MS 30 to the town of Potts Camp ending at MS 178. All of MS 349 travels within Holly Springs National Forest. A loop of MS 349 runs to the east of the highway near Bethlehem is designated Mississippi Highway 347.

Route description
MS 349 begins in Union County at an intersection with MS 30, roughly halfway between New Albany and Oxford along the banks of the Tallahatchie River. It follows along the northern bank of the river as it winds its way northeast for a few miles, where it makes a sharp left turn, before crossing into Marshall County. The highway immediately passes through the community of Cornersville, where it makes another sharp left, before leaving the Tallahatchie River curving northward, traveling through farmland as it passes through the community of Bethlehem. MS 349 begins following the Tippah River as it crosses some wooded hills before entering the town of Potts Camp at a crossing of Oaklimeter Creek. It enters town along South Center Street, passing through neighborhoods before crossing railroad tracks into downtown, first intersecting Front Avenue (which carries unsigned MS 701), coming to an end shortly thereafter at an intersection MS 178 (Church Avenue) at the center of town.

Though MS 349 does not continue to Interstate 22, there is signage at exit 41 (the Potts Camp exit) stating "To 349 - Potts Camp." The entire length of MS 349 is a rural, two-lane, state highway.

Major intersections

Related route

It acts as an eastern loop off of MS 349, serving several local farms.

MS 347 begins as Macedonia Road in the community of Bethlehem at an intersection with MS 349. The road winds its way across a wooded ridge for the next mile before lowering down into valley and passing through farmland. The entire length of Mississippi Highway 347 is a rural, unsigned, and narrow two-lane road.

References

External links

349
Transportation in Union County, Mississippi
Transportation in Marshall County, Mississippi